The Third Djumhana Cabinet was the fourth cabinet established by the State of Pasundan. It was composed of nine ministers and one official. Its term of office ran from 18 July 1949 to 11 January 1950.

Background
On 16 July 1949, the Indonesia, Unity, Indonesian Nationhood Party and the Pasundan People's Party in the Parliament of Pasundan were united to form a "National Front". The front stated that they demand the entire cabinet to resign and for the prime minister to form a new cabinet on a broader basis. 

The formation of the cabinet was announced on 17 July 1949, and the cabinet was installed on the following day. The program of the cabinet was to:
 Establishment of a strong order in the State of Pasundan
 Elimination of illiteracy
 Struggle for a free and sovereign United States of Indonesia based on the Renville Agreement and the Roem–Van Roijen Agreement

Composition

Ministers

The end of the cabinet
After the recognition of Indonesia by the Dutch government on 27 December 1949, Djumhana resigned as the prime minister. The outgoing cabinet was officially replaced by the Anwar Cabinet on 11 January 1950.

Bibliography

References

Notes 

Cabinets of Pasundan
Cabinets established in 1949
Cabinets disestablished in 1949